In evolutionary game theory, complete mixing refers to an assumption about the type of interactions that occur between individual organisms.  Interactions between individuals in a population attains complete mixing if and only if the probably individual x interacts with individual y is equal for all y.

This assumption is implicit in the replicator equation a system of differential equations that represents one model in evolutionary game theory.  This assumption usually does not hold for most organismic populations, since usually interactions occur in some spatial setting where individuals are more likely to interact with those around them.  Although the assumption is empirically violated, it represents a certain sort of scientific idealization which may or may not be harmful to the conclusions reached by that model.  This question has led individuals to investigate a series of other models where there is not complete mixing (e.g. Cellular automata models).

Game theory
Population genetics